Domiporta granatina is a species of sea snail, a marine gastropod mollusk in the family Mitridae, the miters or miter snails.

Description

Distribution
This species occurs in the Red Sea and in the Indian Ocean off Aldabra and the Mascarene Basin.

References

 Drivas, J.; Jay, M. (1987). Coquillages de La Réunion et de l'Île Maurice. Collection Les Beautés de la Nature. Delachaux et Niestlé: Neuchâtel. . 159 pp.
 Liu, J.Y. [Ruiyu] (ed.). (2008). Checklist of marine biota of China seas. China Science Press. 1267 pp. 
 Steyn, D.G & Lussi, M. (2005). Offshore Shells of Southern Africa: A pictorial guide to more than 750 Gastropods. Published by the authors. Pp. i–vi, 1–289.
 Maxwell S.J., Dekkers A.M., Berschauer D.P. & Congdon B.C. (2017). A new Domiporta species (Gastropoda, Mitridae) from tropical Queensland. The Festivus. 49(3): 199-205
 Tsuchiya K. (2017). Family Mitridae. Pp. 973-982, in: T. Okutani (ed.), Marine Mollusks in Japan, ed. 2. 2 vols. Tokai University Press. 1375 pp

External links
  Reeve L.A. (1844-1845). Monograph of the genus Mitra. In: Conchologia Iconica, vol. 2, pl. 1-39 and unpaginated text. L. Reeve & Co., London. [stated dates: pl. 1-7, August 1844; pl. 8-15, September 1844; pl. 16-19, October 1844; pl. 20-23, November 1844; pl. 24-27, December 1844; pl. 28-29, January 1845; pl. 30 imprinted March 1844, presumably March 1845; pl. 31-39, March 1845 
 Lamarck [J.B.M.de. (1811). Suite de la détermination des espèces de Mollusques testacés. Mitre (Mitra.). Annales du Muséum National d'Histoire Naturelle. 17: 195-222]
 Jickeli, C. F. (1874). Studien über die Conchylien des Rothen Meeres. I. Die Gattung Mitra Lam. Jahrbücher der Deutschen Malakozoologischen Gesellschaft. 1: 17-55

Mitridae
Gastropods described in 1811